The Dear Girl Tour (stylized as the Dear G I R L Tour) is the debut concert tour by American singer-songwriter Pharrell Williams. The tour supports his second studio album, G I R L, and consist of 26 dates in Europe. The trek started on September 7, 2014 at the ITU Stadium in Istanbul, Turkey. The support acts for the tour were Foxes and Cris Cab.

Opening acts 
Cris Cab
Foxes

Set list 
This set list is representative of the performance in Paris, France, on October 13, 2014. It does not represent all concerts for the duration of the tour.

 "Come Get It Bae"
 "Frontin'"
 "Hunter"
 "Marilyn Monroe"
 "Brand New"
 "Hot in Herre"
 "I Just Wanna Love U (Give It 2 Me)"
 "Pass the Courvoisier, Part II"
 "Gush"
 "Rock Star"
 "Lapdance"
 "She Wants to Move"
 "Beautiful"
 "Drop It Like It's Hot"
 "Lost Queen"
 "It Girl"
 "Hollaback Girl"
 "Blurred Lines"
 "Get Lucky"
Encore
"Lose Yourself to Dance"
 "Gust of Wind"
 "Happy"

Shows

References 

2014 concert tours
Pharrell Williams